Mowlan-e Olya (also Romanized as Mowlān-e ‘Olyā; also known as Mowlān) is a village in Mehmandust Rural District, Kuraim District, Nir County, Ardabil Province, Iran. At the 2006 census, its population was 51, in 12 families.

References 

Tageo

Towns and villages in Nir County